Dennis Hildeby (born 19 August 2001) is a Swedish professional ice hockey Goaltender for Färjestad BK of the Swedish Hockey League (SHL) on loan from the Toronto Maple Leafs of the National Hockey League (NHL). Hildeby was drafted in the fourth round, 122nd overall by the Maple Leafs in the 2022 NHL Entry Draft.

Playing career
Hildeby played in his youth for Åker/Strängnäs, Hudiksvalls HC, Hud/Alf/Bol/SIK/SL, Timrå IK and Färjestad BK. He played in the 2020–21 season on a loan for Linden Hockey in the HockeyEttan. 

Hildeby played in seven regular season games with Färjestad (SHL) during the 2021–22 season and he won with the team the SHL-title. He was drafted in the fourth round, 122nd overall by the Toronto Maple Leafs in the 2022 NHL Entry Draft. He signed on July 13, 2022 a three-year, entry-level contract with the Toronto Maple Leafs. He returned to Färjestad on a loan to earn some more experience.

Career statistics

Awards and honours

References

External links

2001 births
Living people
Färjestad BK players
Swedish ice hockey goaltenders
Toronto Maple Leafs draft picks